Venus in Overdrive is the 16th studio album by rock musician Rick Springfield. According to an interview that Springfield gave to the website Songfacts, the title track was written about his wife, Barbara Porter, whom he married in 1984.  The album spent two weeks on Billboard's album chart.

Track listing
All lyrics written by Rick Springfield; all music composed by Springfield and Matt Bissonette.

Bonus Track iTunes U.S. - 13. 
“Pretty Little Mess“

Bonus track on German edition - 13. "Who Killed Rock 'N' Roll?"

Bonus tracks on Best Buy edition - 13. "My Generation"  14. "Jessie's Girl (Acoustic)"

Charts

Personnel
Rick Springfield - lead vocals, guitars
Matt Bissonette - bass, backing vocals
George Bernhardt - guitars
Derek Hilland - keyboards
Rodger Carter - drums

References

External links
 Rick Springfield Official Website

2008 albums
Rick Springfield albums